Jackson Kiplagat Arap Mandago is a Kenyan politician who currently serves as the senator of Uasin Gishu County. He served as the first Governor of Uasin Gishu County from 2013 to 2022. He was first elected Governor in 2013 and re-elected in 2017 for his second and final term.

Education 
Mandago joined Kenyatta University and pursued a bachelor's degree in biochemistry. He later joined the Catholic University of Eastern Africa (CUEA) to pursue procurement and strategic planning.

References 

1974 births
Living people
County Governors of Kenya
Jubilee Party politicians